Yeung Uk Road is one of the 17 constituencies in the Tsuen Wan District of Hong Kong.

The constituency returns one district councillor to the Tsuen Wan District Council, with an election every four years.

Yeung Uk Road constituency is loosely based on the eastern part of the Yeung Uk Road including Bo Shek Mansion, Tsuen Wan Garden, Indi Home and Chelsea Court with estimated population of 17,799.

Councillors represented

Election results

2010s

2000s

1990s

References

Tsuen Wan
Constituencies of Hong Kong
Constituencies of Tsuen Wan District Council
1994 establishments in Hong Kong
Constituencies established in 1994